General elections were held in Montserrat on 18 March 1955. The result was a victory for the Montserrat Labour Party, which won three of the five seats in the Legislative Council. The other two seats were taken by the independent candidate Robert William Griffith (who had left the MLP) and a Merchant Planter, William Lleweyn Wall.

Results

Elected MPs

References

Elections in Montserrat
Montserrat
1955 in Montserrat
Election and referendum articles with incomplete results
March 1955 events in North America